Agdistis neglecta is a moth in the family Pterophoridae. It is known from Spain, Portugal, southern France, the Balearic Islands, Corsica, mainland Italy and Sardinia.

The wingspan is 16–21 mm. The forewings are brown.

The larvae feed on Frankenia species.

References

Agdistinae
Moths of Europe
Moths described in 1976